Bulls football may refer to:
 Buffalo Bulls football, the intercollegiate American football team for the University at Buffalo, New York
 Miami Northwestern Bulls, the football team of Miami Northwestern Senior High School, Florida
 South Florida Bulls football, which represents the University of South Florida

See also
 Buffalo Bills, an NFL football team
 Johnson C. Smith Golden Bulls and Lady Golden Bulls, North Carolina